Cymothoe anitorgis, the white-spot red glider, is a butterfly in the family Nymphalidae. It is found in eastern Nigeria, Cameroon, Gabon, the Republic of the Congo and the Democratic Republic of the Congo (Moyen-Congo). The habitat consists of forests.

References

Butterflies described in 1874
Cymothoe (butterfly)
Butterflies of Africa
Taxa named by William Chapman Hewitson